Dushinkovo is a village in Dzhebel Municipality, Kardzhali Province, southern Bulgaria.

The village of Dushinkovo has 104 inhabitants (2011 census). All inhabitants are ethnic  Turks and are  Muslim by religion. It had a much larger population (around 600 people) in the 1980s, but most inhabitants emigrated because of the assimilation policy towards ethnic Turks during Communist rule.

References

Villages in Kardzhali Province